O. L. Anderson (September 28, 1930 – October 25, 2022) was an American politician. He served as a Republican member of the South Dakota House of Representatives.

Life and career 
Anderson attended Beresford High School and St. Olaf College. He served in the United States Army during the Korean War.

In 1971, Anderson was elected to the South Dakota House of Representatives, serving until 1980.

Anderson died in October 2022, at the age of 92.

References 

1930 births
2022 deaths
Republican Party members of the South Dakota House of Representatives
20th-century American politicians
St. Olaf College alumni